"Bad Medicine" is a song by American rock band Bon Jovi. It was written by Jon Bon Jovi, Richie Sambora, and Desmond Child, and was released in September 3, 1988, as the lead single from the band's fourth album New Jersey. The song reached number one on the US Billboard Hot 100, Bon Jovi's third single to do so, and became a top-ten hit in Australia, Canada, Finland, Ireland, the Netherlands and New Zealand.

Cash Box said that "producer Bruce Fairbairn and Jon Bon Jovi fashion gang harmonies around a typically monumental guitar sound."

Music video
There are two videos for the song, one with the band live in concert, and a more well-known live video in which a crowd of young people waiting in line to get into the video shoot is asked by Sam Kinison if they (the public) "can make a better Bon Jovi video than these guys can." The crowd gives a very enthusiastic response, and members of the crowd are given hand-held cameras and invited onstage to help shoot the video.

Charts

Weekly charts

Year-end charts

Certifications

See also
 List of Billboard Hot 100 number-one singles of 1988
 List of glam metal albums and songs

References

Bon Jovi songs
1988 singles
Billboard Hot 100 number-one singles
Cashbox number-one singles
Songs written by Desmond Child
Songs written by Jon Bon Jovi
Songs written by Richie Sambora
Song recordings produced by Bruce Fairbairn
Mercury Records singles
Music videos directed by Wayne Isham
1988 songs